Milicent Jessie Eleanor Bagot, CBE (28 March 1907 – 26 May 2006) was a British intelligence officer. She was the purported model for the character Connie Sachs, the eccentric Sovietology expert  who appeared in John le Carré's novels Tinker, Tailor, Soldier, Spy, The Honourable Schoolboy and Smiley's People, and the character of Muriel Edge in two of the 'Troy' novels by John Lawton – Black Out and Old Flames.

Early life and education 
Milicent Jessie Eleanor Bagot was born on 28 March 1907 to Ethel (née Garratt) (d. 1944) and Cecil Villiers Bagot (1865–1940), MA a London solicitor. She was the paternal  great-great-granddaughter of William Bagot, 1st Baron Bagot, 6th Baronet and the maternal granddaughter of Jesse Garratt, of Wateringbury, Kent. 

Bagot was educated at Putney High School and Lady Margaret Hall, Oxford (MA), where she took a Class IV in Classical Moderations in 1927.

Career 
Bagot began work as a temporary registry clerk with the Metropolitan Police Special Branch in 1929, at the age of 22. She entered the Ministry of Defence from Scotland Yard as a secretary in 1931, when her section was transferred to MI5. The move resulted in a forced significant pay cut of £8 a year, a not inconsiderable sum at the time. She went on to work for both MI5 and MI6. 

During her long career Bagot became one of the security service's principal experts on Soviet Communism. She was the first person to warn MI5 that Kim Philby, MI6 officer and Soviet KGB double agent, had been a member of the Communist party.  Philby's denial of this fact led to his eventual resignation from MI6, and his flight to Moscow.

Bagot also wrote a definitive account of the 1924 Zinoviev Affair in which a forged letter purported to be from Grigory Zinoviev, president of the executive committee of the Comintern, urged the British working class to rise up in an armed insurrection. The publication of the letter is thought by some to have had an effect on the subsequent electoral defeat of the Ramsay MacDonald-led Labour Government. It has also been suggested that MI5 or MI6 may have been involved in leaking the forged letter, which probably originated from anti-Soviet emigrants living in Latvia.

During the Second World War Bagot worked as a clerk in the Registry and the counter subversion section, at Wormwood Scrubs and later at Blenheim Palace. She later spent time in the Middle East advising on how to counter Soviet subversion to British authorities in the area. By the late 1940s she was recognised as a leading expert on Soviet Communism. Her knowledge was supposed to have impressed J Edgar Hoover. In 1949 she was promoted to officer.

In 1953 Bagot became the first female intelligence officer in MI5 to reach the rank of Assistant Director, taking charge of an Overseas Branch section. She retired in 1967.

Recognition and commemoration 
Bagot was made an MBE in 1949 and promoted to CBE in 1967. She lived in Putney for most of her life.

A blue plaque was unveiled on 15 October 2021 at Milicent Bagot's former home in Putney.

References

1907 births
2006 deaths
Alumni of Lady Margaret Hall, Oxford
Secret Intelligence Service personnel
Commanders of the Order of the British Empire
MI5 personnel
People from Putney